Leanna is an unincorporated community in Allen and Neosho counties in the U.S. state of Kansas.

History
A post office was opened in Leanna in 1881, and remained in operation until it was discontinued in 1920.

References

Further reading

External links
 Allen County maps: Current, Historic, KDOT
 Neosho County maps: Current, Historic, KDOT

Unincorporated communities in Allen County, Kansas
Unincorporated communities in Kansas
1881 establishments in Kansas
Populated places established in 1881